Heol-y-Cyw is a little village in Bridgend County Borough, Wales, located near Bridgend, in the community of Coychurch Higher. The village, and its surroundings, had a population of 538 in 2011 census.

Amenities 
Heol-y-Cyw has one Nonconformist chapel, an Anglican church, a working men's club, and two pubs.

The local rugby club, Heol y Cyw RFC celebrated its 100th anniversary in 2005. As a part of the celebrations, a book recording the village and rugby club was published in 2005.

References

External links 
www.geograph.co.uk : photos of Heol-y-Cyw and surrounding area

Villages in Bridgend County Borough